Suits Anyone Fine is an EP by the Swedish rock band Sahara Hotnights released in May 1997.

Tracks 
"Out of My Mouth"
"Suits Anyone Fine"
"Tasty"
"Holding My Own Hand"

1997 EPs